Haplohippus is an extinct genus of the modern horse family Equidae, that lived in the Eocene, from 42 to 38 million years ago. Fossil remains of Haplohippus have been found in the Clarno Formation, part of the John Day Fossil Beds National Monument of the Northwestern United States. While Haplohippus is quite similar to Orohippus, it is considered more primitive in character than Epihippus.

References

Eocene horses
Eocene odd-toed ungulates
Eocene mammals of North America
Paleogene geology of Oregon
Prehistoric placental genera
John Day Fossil Beds National Monument
Extinct mammals of North America
Eocene genus extinctions
Eocene extinctions
Clarno Formation